Gastonia Township is a township in south-central Gaston County, North Carolina, United States, bordering South Carolina.

Demography and localities

Demographics

According to the 2010 Census, 85,249 people lived in the township, the most populated in the county:
 70,044 live in parts of incorporated localities: 
the vast majority of the county seat Gastonia,
the whole population of Ranlo, and
minor parts of Spencer Mountain and Lowell
 15,205 live in unincorporated places, such as South Gastonia

References 

Townships in Gaston County, North Carolina
Townships in North Carolina